Yamagata Broadcasting Co., Ltd.  (YBC, 山形放送株式会社) is a Japanese broadcaster in Yamagata. Its radio station is affiliated with Japan Radio Network (JRN) and National Radio Network (NRN), and its television station is affiliated with Nippon News Network (NNN) and Nippon TV Network System (NNS).

History 
In the early 1950s, commercial broadcasters began to appear throughout Japan. On February 20, 1953, Yamagata Broadcasting held its first founders' meeting, and Yamagata Shimbun, a local newspaper, had an important role in the establishment of Yamagata Broadcasting, as did most of the first commercial broadcasters in Japan. At that time, the head office of Yamagata Broadcasting was located in Yamagata Shimbun with a capital of 50 million yen.

Broadcasting

Radio
YBC Radio 918 kHz
 Yamagata 5 kW JOEF
 Tsuruoka 1 kW (Old call sign:JOEL)
 Yonezawa 1 kW
 Shinjo 1 kW
 Sakata 500 W
 Oguni 100 W

Analog TV
JOEF-TV - YBC Television Yamagata
 Yamagata 10Ch 3 kW
 Yonezawa 54Ch 100 W
 Shinjo 11Ch 50 W
 Oguni 11Ch 30 W
JOEL-TV - YBC Television Tsuruoka
 Tsuruoka 1Ch 1 kW
 Atsumi 44Ch 30 W

Digital TV(ID:4)
JOEF-DTV - YBC Digital Television Yamagata
 Yamagata 16ch 1 kW

Program

Radio
 Goo-t Mornin!!
 Music Brunch
 GeTukinradiopanpakapaan!
 Saturday Radio Heaven
 Weekend Scramble
 Guidance on One point for Farmers

TV
 Piyotama Wide 430
 YBC News RealTime

Item
 Yamagata News Paper

References

External links
 YBC HomePage

Radio in Japan
Television stations in Japan
Nippon News Network
Television channels and stations established in 1960
Mass media in Yamagata, Yamagata
Television channels and stations disestablished in 2011